Fox Sports Eredivisie was a Dutch premium television service owned by Eredivisie Media & Marketing CV in which Fox Networks Group Benelux (part of Fox) has 51% share. The football clubs (Eredivisie CV) together with Endemol own 49%. There were 3 channels available and all were part of the Fox Sports (Netherlands) premium network. Fox Sports Eredivisie held the exclusive rights for the live matches of the Eredivisie, the highest national football division.

History
It launched as Eredivisie Live at the start of the 2008–09 season on 29 August 2008.  Highlights of the Eredivisie can be seen on the national public broadcaster NOS.

The pundit team includes Jan van Halst, Mario Been and Pierre van Hooijdonk. Gary Lineker provides a weekly analysis of the matches, which can be seen on the website of Eredivisie Live. The website also offers pay-per-view matches.

Between the 2009–10 and 2012–13 seasons, Eredivisie Live broadcast the UEFA Europa League live on Thursdays. From 2013–14 the coverage switched to sister service Fox Sports International for matches of non-Dutch clubs.

The service rebranded into Fox Sports Eredivisie on 1 August 2013.

On 1 October 2020, it was announced that the networks would rebrand as ESPN on 31 December 2020, due to the acquisition of 21st Century Fox by Disney.

Coverage
 Eredivisie All games live
 KNVB Cup All games live
 Keuken Kampioen Divisie Live Match on Friday(20.00) & Monday(20.00)
 UEFA Europa League: Games included with Dutch Teams live

Channels
 Fox Sports 1
 Fox Sports 2
 Fox Sports 3

External links
 Fox Sports

References

 

Fox Sports International
Defunct television channels in the Netherlands
Television channels and stations established in 2008
Television channels and stations disestablished in 2020
Eredivisie